Kathryn Fudge (born 10 November 1989) is a British handball player. She plays for LC Brühl Handball the British national team, and competed at the 2012 Summer Olympics in London. She was born in Bury.

Kathryn used to play football as a child for Bury Girls and Ladies FC. She became the first British female handball player to score a goal at the 2012 Olympics.

She signed for SPL 1 team LC Brühl in August 2012. She later signed for LC Brühl, winning two titles with the club.

References

External links

1989 births
Living people
British female handball players
Handball players at the 2012 Summer Olympics
Olympic handball players of Great Britain
Sportspeople from Bury, Greater Manchester